Jayne Brook (born Jane Anderson) is an American actress, best known for her roles as Dr. Diane Grad on the medical drama Chicago Hope, as a series regular for five of the show's six seasons, and Mary Ann Mitchell on The District from 2000 to 2002. Between 2017 and 2019, Brook had a recurring role as Starfleet Vice Admiral Katrina Cornwell in the series Star Trek: Discovery.

Early life
Brook was born in Northbrook, Illinois. She graduated from Glenbrook North High School in 1978 at the age of 17. She attended New College in Oxford, England, and Duke University on scholarship, earning a bachelor's degree in 1982. Brook is married to actor and director John Terlesky. They have two daughters, Alexandra Sophia and Annaliese Marie.

Career
Brook had acted in Britain's regional theatres and in London before she went to Los Angeles to begin acting on TV. She also worked briefly as a model.

Her first acting role was in the film Superman IV: The Quest for Peace in 1987. During the late 1980s, she worked for a while in Great Britain, appearing in The Old Boy Network, a single season ITV comedy series about three ex-spies who set up as private investigators after the end of the Cold War.

Brook went on to appear in numerous film and television roles, first as Carolyn in the 1991 film Don't Tell Mom the Babysitter's Dead, a starring role in the spring 1993 ABC network version of Sirens, a guest star for a three-episode arc of L.A. Law and in the 1995 film Bye Bye Love. She also had a small part as a child's mother in Kindergarten Cop (1990). She had a major role in My Mother, the Spy (2000).

Her starring role in the ensemble cast of Chicago Hope, from 1994 to 1999, was followed by appearances in regular or recurring roles on such series as Sports Night, The District, John Doe, Boston Legal and Private Practice.  Brook has been a guest star in single episodes of other series, including reuniting with her former Chicago Hope  co-star Mark Harmon in a 2007 episode, "Cover Story", of his CBS television series NCIS.

From 2017 to 2019, Brook had a recurring role as Starfleet Admiral Katrina Cornwell on the first two seasons of Star Trek: Discovery.

Filmography

References

External links
 
 

Living people
20th-century American actresses
21st-century American actresses
Actresses from Illinois
American film actresses
American television actresses
Duke University alumni
People from Northbrook, Illinois
Glenbrook North High School alumni
Year of birth missing (living people)